Wayne is a city in Wayne County, Nebraska, United States. The population was 5,660 at the 2010 census. It is the county seat of Wayne County and the home of Wayne State College.

History
Wayne was founded in 1881 when the Chicago, St. Paul, Minneapolis & Omaha Railroad was extended to that point. It was named for and with  Wayne County.

Geography
Wayne is located at  (42.235990, -97.017019).

Climate
According to the Köppen Climate Classification system, Wayne has a hot-summer humid continental climate, abbreviated "Dfa" on climate maps.

Demographics

2010 census
At the 2010 census there were 5,660 people, 1,953 households, and 987 families living in the city. The racial makeup of the city was 93.2% White, 2.1% African American, 0.5% Native American, 0.7% Asian, 0.2% Pacific Islander, 2.0% from other races, and 1.4% from two or more races. Hispanic or Latino of any race were 4.8%.

Of the 1,953 households 23.3% had children under the age of 18 living with them, 41.4% were married couples living together, 6.7% had a female householder with no husband present, 2.5% had a male householder with no wife present, and 49.5% were non-families. 33.6% of households were one person and 12.8% were one person aged 65 or older. The average household size was 2.25 and the average family size was 2.90.

The median age was 22.9 years. 15.5% of residents were under the age of 18; 39.8% were between the ages of 18 and 24; 16.7% were from 25 to 44; 15.6% were from 45 to 64; and 12.4% were 65 or older. The gender makeup of the city was 49.2% male and 50.8% female.

2000 census
At the 2000 census, there were 5,583 people, 1,850 households, and 989 families living in the city. The population density was 2,550.9 people per square mile (984.3/km). There were 1,963 housing units at an average density of 896.9 per square mile (346.1/km). The racial makeup of the city was 96.35% White, 1.59% African American, 0.36% Native American, 0.34% Asian, 0.02% Pacific Islander, 0.43% from other races, and 0.91% from two or more races. Hispanic or Latino of any race were 1.42% of the population.

Of the 1,850 households 24.6% had children under the age of 18 living with them, 45.3% were married couples living together, 6.4% had a female householder with no husband present, and 46.5% were non-families. 28.6% of households were one person and 11.6% were one person aged 65 or older. The average household size was 2.36 and the average family size was 2.90.

The age distribution was 15.7% under the age of 18, 39.6% from 18 to 24, 17.4% from 25 to 44, 13.9% from 45 to 64, and 13.4% 65 or older. The median age was 23 years. For every 100 females, there were 85.6 males. For every 100 females age 18 and over, there were 85.7 males.

The median household income was $27,730, and the median family income  was $51,033. Males had a median income of $30,560 versus $20,847 for females. The per capita income for the city was $13,984. About 7.5% of families and 20.0% of the population were below the poverty line, including 6.9% of those under age 18 and 7.4% of those age 65 or over.

Wayne Community Schools operates public schools.

Wayne State College is in Wayne.
  
St.Mary's Catholic Private School. Which is a Private School.

Notable People

 James B. Davis, U.S. Air Force general
 Emily Kinney, musician and television actress (The Walking Dead)
 Don Meyer, college basketball coach

References

Cities in Wayne County, Nebraska
Cities in Nebraska
County seats in Nebraska
1881 establishments in Nebraska